The 2019–20 season is Wellington Phoenix's 13th season since its establishment in 2007. The club is participating in the A-League for the 13th time, the FFA Cup for the sixth time.

On 24 March 2020, the FFA announced that the 2019–20 A-League season would be postponed until further notice due to the COVID-19 pandemic in Australia and New Zealand, and subsequently extended indefinitely. The season resumed on 17 July 2020.

Review

Pre-season
On 15 April, it was announced that Rudan would not see out the second year of his contract and would leave at season's end due to personal reasons. On 4 May 2019, it was announced Ufuk Talay would be taking the reigns of head coach after the departure of Mark Rudan on a one-year deal.

Following the end of the 2018–19 season, Phoenix released nine players including the likes of Mandi, Nathan Burns, Cillian Sheridan, Michał Kopczyński and Ryan Lowry. On 27 May, Wellington Phoenix announced that Johnny Warren Medalist and Golden boot winner Roy Krishna would be departing the club. On 11 June, it was announced that the longest serving captain Andrew Durante will departing the club along with David Williams. A week later, defender Tom Doyle also was announced as leaving the club. On 1 July, it was announced that Sarpreet Singh had departed the club for Bayern Munich II after they paid an undisclosed fee between $750,000–$1,000,000.

In his first press conference, Talay expressed his idea of building a young team with a strong Kiwi core. He made his first signing with All Whites goalkeeper Stefan Marinovic and signed local Kiwi players, Te Atawhai Hudson-Wihongi, Tim Payne, and Callum McCowatt. Talay made his first import signing with Mexican Ulises Dávila following another import signing of English striker, David Ball. On 24 July, it was announced that Steven Taylor would be the captain heading into the new season while Alex Rufer was made vice-captain. On 18 August, it was announced that Phoenix had paid an undisclosed fee for Reno Piscopo, marking the first time the club paid a transfer fee for a player. Talay also made a handful of signings of young Australian players including Walter Scott, Jaushua Sotirio, Cameron Devlin, Liam McGing, and experienced centre-back Luke DeVere. Talay used his fourth import spot signing Matti Steinmann on a one-year deal.

Talay had a positive start to his managerial tenure with the Wellington Phoenix when he led them to a 7–0 victory over Wairarapa United in a pre-season friendly in his first match in charge.
They were knocked-out of the 2019 FFA Cup in the Round of 32, losing 4–2 on penalties to Brisbane Strikers, after making an extraordinary comeback from 2–0 down to a 2–2 draw at full time.

Wellington Phoenix finished with an unbeaten record in pre-season friendlies, drawing 0–0 with Sydney FC, 1–1 with Western Sydney Wanderers, and 1–1 with Melbourne Victory. They also defeated NPL opposition Wollongong Wolves 4–0 and New Zealand club Team Wellington 2–0.

October
Wellington Phoenix lost their opening game of the season falling 1–0 at home to A-League newcomers Western United coached by former coach Mark Rudan.
On 17 October, Wellington Phoenix announced the signing of English striker, Gary Hooper on a one-year marquee deal.

November
Wellington Phoenix equaled their worst start to a season following 4 narrow defeats to fellow A-League clubs in the first 4 rounds picking up 0 points. In Round 5, Wellington Phoenix drew 1–1 with Melbourne Victory picking up their first point. Wellington Phoenix won their first game of season in Round 6 beating Brisbane Roar 2–1 at home. Ulises Dávila was voted for Player of the Month for November.

December
In rounds 7, 8, and 9, Wellington Phoenix were 2–1 victors over Brisbane Roar, Adelaide United and the Western Sydney Wanderers accumulating 9 points and moving up into the top six. It was the first time since 2014 Wellington Phoenix had beaten Adelaide United in Adelaide. In Round 10, Wellington Phoenix drew with Melbourne Victory in yet another draw despite having an extra man advantage. Round 11 saw Wellington Phoenix produce one of their best performances of the season playing out a 2–2 draw with champions Sydney FC despite dominating the match Wellington Phoenix finished off the year with a dominant 3–1 win over Western United away from home making the win their biggest win of the season so far. Following the win, Wellington Phoenix were described as the second-best team in the A-League right now after reigning Champions Sydney FC by former Premier League winner Robbie Slater. Head coach Ufuk Talay was voted Coach of the Month, while Cameron Devlin was voted Player of the Month. Reno Piscopo was deemed as the December Nominee for the Young Footballer of the Year.

January
Wellington Phoenix won their first game of the year with a gritty 2–1 win over the Mariners followed by a 2–0 win over Wanderers thus matching their best ever unbeaten run. Wellington Phoenix's 9-game unbeaten run came to end with a shock loss to Brisbane Roar. Wellington Phoenix won their last game of the month with a 2–1 win over the Newcastle Jets accumulating 9 points from possible 12 cementing their fourth spot in the ladder. Following a run of strong consistent performances, Cameron Devlin was deemed as the January Nominee for Young Footballer of the Year.

February
Wellington Phoenix lost their first game of the month 4–2 to Perth Glory in an encouraging effort. Wellington Phoenix then went on to beat Melbourne City for a crucial 1–0 win at Eden Park in front of more than 15,000 fans followed by yet another dominating 2–0 victory over Western United the following week. The two wins saw Wellington Phoenix move up to 3rd place on the ladder accumulating 6 points from possible 9. David Ball was voted for Player of the Month for February following a string of consistent performances.

March & Effects of the 2019–20 Coronavirus Pandemic
Wellington Phoenix continued their strong form into March with a dominant 3–1 over the Central Coast Mariners and a strong 3–0 win over Melbourne Victory. This run of 4 consecutive wins saw Wellington Phoenix match their best ever run of consecutive wins. Due to the required self isolation required after overseas travel imposed by the Australian Government imposed on 16 March 2020, Wellington Phoenix were required to self-isolate when arriving in Australia due to playing in Wellington on 15 March 2020. Due to the postponement of games involving Wellington Phoenix, the FFA announced that games would be rescheduled in order to complete the season in a condensed period. On 16 March 2020, the FFA announced that the remainder of the season would proceed with all games being played behind closed doors. Wellington Phoenix intended to relocate for the remainder of the season in Sydney in order to keep playing the remainder of its scheduled games. On 24 March 2020, the FFA announced that the season would be postponed until further notice due to the COVID-19 pandemic in Australia and New Zealand. With the suspension of the league announced, the club returned to Wellington on 24 March 2020. An assessment will be made by the FFA on 22 April 2020.

Players

Transfers

From youth squad

Transfers in

Transfers out

Contract extensions

Technical staff

Squad statistics

Appearances and goals

{| class="wikitable sortable plainrowheaders" style="text-align:center"
|-
! rowspan="2" |
! rowspan="2" |
! rowspan="2" style="width:190px;" |Player
! colspan="2" style="width:87px;" |A-League
! colspan="2" style="width:87px;" |FFA Cup
! colspan="2" style="width:87px;" |Total
|-
!
!Goals
!
!Goals
!
!Goals
|-
|1
|
! scope="row" | Stefan Marinovic

|26
|0

|1
|0

!27
!0
|-
|2
|
! scope="row" | Liam McGing

|0(3)
|0

|1
|0

!4
!0
|-
|3
|
! scope="row" | Luke DeVere

|24
|0

|1
|0

!25
!0
|-
|4
|
! scope="row" | Te Atawhai Hudson-Wihongi

|3(7)
|0

|1
|0

!11
!0
|-
|5
|
! scope="row" | Matti Steinmann

|23
|0

|0
|0

!23
!0
|-
|6
|
! scope="row" | Tim Payne

|15(1)
|0

|1
|0

!17
!0
|-
|7
|
! scope="row" | Reno Piscopo

|16(4)
|2

|0
|0

!20
!2
|-
|8
|
! scope="row" | Cameron Devlin

|16(4)
|0

|1
|1

!21
!1
|-
|9
|
! scope="row" | David Ball

|23(1)
|6

|1
|0

!25
!6
|-
|10
|
! scope="row" | Ulises Dávila

|22(3)
|12

|0
|0

!25
!12
|-
|11
|
! scope="row" | Jaushua Sotirio

|14(10)
|4

|0
|0

!24
!4
|-
|12
|
! scope="row" | Brandon Wilson

|2(2)
|0

|0
|0

!4
!0
|-
|13
|
! scope="row" | Liberato Cacace

|24
|3

|1
|0

!25
!3
|-
|14
|
! scope="row" | Alex Rufer

|11(8)
|0

|1
|0

!20
!0
|-
|16
|
! scope="row" | Louis Fenton

|7(1)
|0

|0
|0

!8
!0
|-
|17
|
! scope="row" | Callan Elliot

|3(1)
|0

|0(1)
|0

!5
!0
|-
|20
|
! scope="row" | Oliver Sail

|0
|0

|0
|0

!0
!0
|-
|21
|
! scope="row" | Callum McCowatt

|14(10)
|1

|1
|1

!25
!2
|-
|23
|
! scope="row" | Walter Scott

|2(1)
|0

|0(1)
|0

!4
!0
|-
|27
|
! scope="row" | Steven Taylor

|26
|1

|0
|0

!26
!1
|-
|31
|
! scope="row" | Ben Waine

|1(14)
|1

|1
|0

!16
!1
|-
|32
|
! scope="row" | Sam Sutton

|1(4)
|0

|0
|0

!4
!0
|-
|88
|
! scope="row" | Gary Hooper

|13(8)
|8

|0
|0

!21
!8
|}

Disciplinary record

Clean sheets

Friendlies

Competitions

Overall

Overview
{|class="wikitable" style="text-align:left"
|-
!rowspan=2 style="width:140px;"|Competition
!colspan=8|Record
|-
!style="width:30px;"|
!style="width:30px;"|
!style="width:30px;"|
!style="width:30px;"|
!style="width:30px;"|
!style="width:30px;"|
!style="width:30px;"|
!style="width:50px;"|
|-
|A-League

|-
|FFA Cup

|-
!Total

FFA Cup

A-League

League table

Results summary

Result by round

Matches

Finals series

References

Wellington Phoenix FC seasons
2019–20 A-League season by team